Acacia alata (common name: winged wattle) is a shrub belonging to the genus Acacia.

Description
Its branchlets are often bent alternately in different directions.

The phyllodes (modified petioles) are reduced in size and give the impression of cladodes (branches that resemble leaves). Furthermore, each phyllode extends into a spine.

A. alata blooms between April and December. The inflorescence is simple with mostly two flowers per axil, but sometimes distributed in racemes. The globular heads contain 4 to 15 flowers. These flowers can be white, cream-coloured or golden yellow. The last flower form is preferred for cultivation.

Classification
The species was first formally described by the botanist Robert Brown in 1813 in William Townsend Aiton's work Hortus Kewensis.

Four varieties are recognized :
Acacia alata var. alata
Acacia alata var. biglandulosa 
Acacia alata var. platyptera
Acacia alata var. tetrantha

Distribution
The species is distributed throughout the west coast Western Australia from north of Geraldton to south around Albany. It grows in a variety of soils types in areas near streams, rocky hills, salt pans and clay flats.

See also
List of Acacia species

References

External links
Australian National Botanical Gardens : Acacia alata
World Wide Wattle: Acacia alata. Retrieved 29 May 2018.

alata
Fabales of Australia
Acacias of Western Australia
Plants described in 1813
Taxa named by Robert Brown (botanist, born 1773)